Pseudagrion rubriceps, saffron-faced blue dart, is a species of damselfly in the family Coenagrionidae. It is found in many tropical Asian countries.

Description and habitat
It is a medium sized damselfly with bright orange eyes, greenish below. The male is easily distinguished from all other Pseudagrion species by the brilliant reddish-orange face, from which it derives its common name. Its thorax is olive green above and azure blue on the sides. There is a narrow mid-dorsal carina and humeral stripes in black. Abdomen is blue on the sides, broadly marked with black on dorsum, up to segment 8. Segments 9 and 10 are azure blue without any marks. Anal appendages are black.

Eyes, face and thorax of the female is yellowish green, marked as in the male. Color of the abdomen is similar to the male; but paler. Segments 8 and 9 are also black with fine apical blue rings. Segment 10 is pale blue.

Widely distributed throughout the plains and submontane areas. It breeds in weedy streams and ponds.

Subspecies
Two subspecies recognized.
 Pseudagrion rubriceps ceylonicum - Endemic to Sri Lanka 
 Pseudagrion rubriceps rubriceps - Other Asian countries.

See also 
 List of odonates of India
 List of odonates of Sri Lanka
 List of odonata of Kerala

References 

 Animal Diversity Web
 NCBI

External links

Coenagrionidae
Insects described in 1876